This list of Chinese monarchs includes rulers of China with various titles prior to the establishment of the Republic in 1912. From the Zhou dynasty until the Qin dynasty, rulers usually held the title "king". With the separation of China into different Warring States, this title had become so common that the unifier of China, the first Qin Emperor Qin Shihuang created a new title for himself, that of "emperor". The title of Emperor of China continued to be used for the remainder of China's imperial history, right down to the fall of the Qing dynasty in 1912.

While many other monarchs existed in and around China throughout its history, this list covers only those with a quasi-legitimate claim to the majority of China, or those who have traditionally been named in king-lists. The following list of Chinese monarchs is in no way comprehensive.

Chinese sovereigns were known by many different names, and how they should be identified is often confusing. Sometimes the same emperor is commonly known by two or three separate names, or the same name is used by emperors of different dynasties. The tables below do not necessarily include all of an emperor's names – for example, posthumous names could run to more than twenty characters and were rarely used in historical writing – but, where possible, the most commonly used name or naming convention has been indicated. Scholars also often use common terms to refer to some monarchs with special circumstances — "Modi" (末帝; "last emperor"), "Mozhu" (末主; "last lord"), "Houzhu" (後主; "later lord"), "Shaodi" (少帝; "young emperor"), "Shaozhu" (少主; "young lord"), "Feidi" (廢帝; "deposed emperor"), etc.; these terms are not temple names, posthumous names or regnal names.

In some cases, the regnal or era name is changed in the same year as the death of the previous sovereign; in other cases, the name change occurs in the subsequent year. Thus, the date given for the beginning of a reign may actually refer to the first full year of the sovereign's reign.

These tables may not necessarily represent the most recently updated information on Chinese monarchs; please check the page for the relevant dynasty for possible additional information.

Follow these links to see how they are related:

Family tree of Chinese monarchs (ancient) → Family tree of Chinese monarchs (Warring States period) →  Chinese emperors family tree (early) → Chinese emperors family tree (middle) → Chinese emperors family tree (late)

Three Sovereigns and Five Emperors (三皇五帝) (2852–2070 BC) 

Although it is ingrained in Chinese accounts that the earliest legendary rulers of China included three huáng (皇, generally translated "sovereign" or "august one") and five dì (帝, generally translated "emperor"), both terms denoting demigod status, their identities have differed between different sources, with some individuals, such as the Yellow Emperor, being regarded as either sovereign or emperor, depending on the source. The two characters would later be taken together by Qin Shi Huang to form the new title huángdì (皇帝, emperor), thus claiming legendary status for himself. They were perceived as admirable and loyal to the individual members that belonged to the emperor.

Note: These figures are considered to be legendary

Xia dynasty (夏朝) (2070–1600 BC) 
Chinese convention: use "Xia" + regnal name

Shang dynasty (商朝) (1600–1046 BC) 
 Chinese convention: use posthumous name

Zhou dynasty (周朝) (1046–256 BC) 
Chinese convention: use "Zhou" + posthumous name ("Wang" is the chinese term for "King")

Note: The first generally accepted date in Chinese history is 841 BC, the beginning of the Gonghe regency. All dates prior to this are the subject of often vigorous dispute.

After King Nan was deposed by Qin, Ji Jie (姬杰), Duke Wen of the vassal duchy of Eastern Zhou was proclaimed the new king of Zhou and claimed the title until his death in 249 BC. However, the King of Qin had taken possession of the Nine Tripod Cauldrons (九鼎), and Ji Jie's reign was not widely recognized.  Historians generally considered the title of Son of Heaven to be vacant from 256 to 221 BC.

Qin dynasty (秦朝) (221–207 BC) 

Chinese convention: use regnal name

Note: The State of Qin was founded in the 9th century BCE as a vassal of the Zhou dynasty. The Duke of Qin, Ying Si (嬴駟), declared himself king in 325 BC and was given the posthumous name King Huiwen of Qin (秦惠文王).  In 256 BC, King Zhaoxiang of Qin ended the Zhou dynasty, and in 221 BC, Ying Zheng completed the conquest of the other states (kingdoms) and declared himself Qin Shi Huang, or "First Emperor of Qin."  The unification of China under the Qin dynasty in 221 BC is usually considered to be the beginning of Imperial China.

Han dynasty (漢朝) (202 BC–9 AD, 25–220 AD) 

Chinese convention: use "Han" + posthumous name (apart from Liu Bang, who is known as "Han Gaozu")
Note that the posthumous names of many Han monarchs bear the character "xiao" (孝; "filial"), but this character is usually omitted by scholars when they are used (i.e. "Emperor Xiaowu" is normally known as "Emperor Wu")

Xin dynasty (新朝) (9–23 AD) 

Chinese convention: use personal name

Three Kingdoms (三國) (220–280 AD) 

Chinese convention: use personal name

Cao Wei (曹魏) (220–266 AD)

Shu Han (蜀漢) (221–263 AD)

Eastern Wu (東吳) (222–280 AD)

Jin dynasty (晉朝) (266–420 AD) 
Chinese convention: Use "Jin" + posthumous name 
Note that the posthumous names of some Jin monarchs bore the character "xiao" (孝; "filial"), but this character is usually omitted by scholars when referencing these monarchs by their posthumous names (i.e. "Emperor Xiaohui" is normally known as "Emperor Hui")

Sixteen Kingdoms (十六國) (304–439 AD) 

Chinese convention: use personal name

Han Zhao (漢趙) (304–329 AD) 
Note: addressed separately in traditional texts as Han (漢) and Qian (Former) Zhao (前趙)

Cheng Han (成漢) (304–347 AD) 
Note: addressed separately in traditional texts as Cheng (成) and Han (漢)

Later Zhao (後趙) (319–351 AD)

Former Liang (前涼) (320–376 AD)

Former Yan (前燕) (337–370 AD)

Former Qin (前秦) (351–394 AD)

Later Yan (後燕) (384–409 AD)

Later Qin (後秦) (384–417 AD)

Western Qin (西秦) (385–400 AD, 409–431 AD)

Later Liang (後涼) (386–403 AD)

Southern Liang (南涼) (397–414 AD)

Northern Liang (北涼) (397–439 AD) 
Note: The Northern Liang was re-established at Gaochang in 442 AD.

Southern Yan (南燕) (398–410 AD)

Western Liang (西涼) (400–421 AD)

Hu Xia (胡夏) (407–431 AD)

Northern Yan (北燕) (407–436 AD)

Other sovereignties traditionally not counted among the Sixteen Kingdoms 
Convention: use personal name

Ran Wei (冉魏) (350–352 AD) 
Note: addressed as Wei in traditional texts

Western Yan (西燕) (384–394 AD)

Western Shu (西蜀) (405–413 AD)

Tiefu tribe (匈奴 鐵弗部) (mid 3rd century–391 AD)

Yuwen tribe (鮮卑 宇文部) (late 3rd century–345 AD)

Duan tribe (鮮卑 段部) (303–338 AD)

Chouchi (仇池) (296–371 AD, 385–443 AD)

Wuxing (武興) (473–506 AD, 534–555 AD)

Yinping (陰平) (477 AD–mid-6th century)

Tuoba tribe (鮮卑 拓拔部) (219–376 AD) & Dai (代) (310–376 AD)

Northern and Southern Dynasties (南北朝) (386–589 AD)

Northern dynasties (北朝) (386–581 AD) 

Chinese convention: use dynasty name + posthumous name

Northern Wei (北魏) (386–535 AD)

Eastern Wei (東魏) (534–550 AD)

Western Wei (西魏) (535–557 AD)

Northern Qi (北齊) (550–577 AD)

Northern Zhou (北周) (557–581 AD)

Southern dynasties (南朝) (420–589 AD) 

Chinese convention: use dynasty name + posthumous name

Liu Song (劉宋) (420–479 AD)

Southern Qi (南齊) (479–502 AD)

Liang dynasty (梁朝) (502–557 AD)

Chen dynasty (陳朝) (557–589 AD)

Sui dynasty (隋朝) (581–619 AD) 

Chinese convention: use "Sui" + posthumous name

Tang dynasty (唐朝) (618–690 AD, 705–907 AD) 

Chinese convention: use "Tang" + temple name (except for Emperor Shang and Emperor Ai; Emperor Xuanzong (唐玄宗) is sometimes referred as Emperor Ming of Tang Dynasty (唐明皇))

Wu Zhou (武周) (690–705 AD)

Huang Qi (黃齊) (881–884 AD)

Five Dynasties and Ten Kingdoms (五代十國) (907–979 AD)

Five Dynasties (五代) (907–960 AD) 
Chinese convention: name of dynasty + temple name or posthumous name

Later Liang (後梁) (907–923 AD)

Later Tang (後唐) (923–937 AD)

Later Jin (後晉) (936–947 AD)

Later Han (後漢) (947–951 AD)

Later Zhou (後周) (951–960 AD)

Ten Kingdoms (十國) (907–979 AD) 
Chinese convention: use personal names, noted otherwise

Former Shu (前蜀) (907–925 AD)

Yang Wu (楊吳) (907–937 AD)

Ma Chu (馬楚) (907–951 AD)

Wuyue (吳越) (907–978 AD)

Min (閩) (909–945 AD) & Yin (殷) (943–945 AD)

Southern Han (南漢) (917–971 AD)

Jingnan (荊南) (924–963 AD)

Later Shu (後蜀) (934–965 AD)

Southern Tang (南唐) (937–976 AD) 
Chinese convention for this dynasty only: Use Nan (Southern) Tang + "Qianzhu" (lit. "first lord"), "Zhongzhu" (lit. "middle lord") or "Houzhu" (lit. "last lord").

Northern Han (北漢) (951–979 AD)

Other states not traditionally counted in the Ten Kingdoms

Qingyuan Jiedushi (清源節度使) (949–978 AD)

Wuping Jiedushi (武平節度使) (950–963 AD)

Liao dynasty (遼朝) (916–1125 AD) 

Chinese convention: use "Liao" + temple name except Liao Tianzuodi who is referred using "Liao" + regnal name

Northern Liao (北遼) (1122–1123 AD) 
Chinese convention: use personal name or "Northern Liao" + temple name

Western Liao (西遼) (1124–1218 AD) 
Chinese convention: use personal name or "Western Liao" + posthumous name

Dongdan (東丹) (926–952 AD)

Song dynasty (宋朝) (960–1279 AD) 

Chinese convention: use "Song" + temple name or posthumous name (except last emperor who was revered as Song Di Bing (宋帝昺 Sòng Dì Bǐng))

Dali Kingdom (大理) (937–1094 AD, 1096–1253 AD)

Western Xia (西夏) (1038–1227 AD) 

Chinese convention: use "Western Xia" + temple name (or use personal name)

The Tangut names for about half of the Western Xia eras are known from Tangut texts or monumental inscriptions, or from Western Xia coins.

Jin dynasty (金朝) (1115–1234 AD) 

Chinese convention: use "Jin" + temple name or posthumous name in Chinese

Yuan dynasty (元朝) (1271–1368 AD) 

Chinese convention: for rulers before Kublai Khan use given name (e.g. Temüjin) or Khan names, use "Yuan" + temple name or posthumous name after

Note:1) The Mongol Great Khans before Khublai were only declared Yuan emperors after the creation of Yuan dynasty in 12712) To non-Chinese readers, usually the khan names are the most familiar names.3) Timur or Temür means the same Mongolian words but Temür will be used for avoiding confusion with Timur the lame (Tamerlane).

Northern Yuan (北元) (1368–1388 AD) 

Retreat of the Yuan court to the Mongolian Plateau after being overthrown by the Ming dynasty in China proper in 1368 (1368 – early 15th century)

Convention: use khan names or birth names.

Ming dynasty (明朝) (1368–1644 AD)

Shun dynasty (順朝) (1644–1645 AD) 
The Shun dynasty was an imperial dynasty created in the brief lapse from Ming to Qing rule in China. It was a state set up by the peasants' rebellion, in which they defeated the Ming forces, but former Ming general Wu Sangui led the Qing forces into Beijing and the Qing forces defeated the rebels.

Southern Ming (南明) (1644–1662 AD) 
The Southern Ming refers to the Ming loyalist regimes that existed in Southern China from 1644 to 1662.  The regime was established by the princes of the already destroyed Ming dynasty. All of these monarchs had their regimes crushed by the Qing forces very quickly. Koxinga (Zheng Chenggong) used the Ming dynasty's name and gathered forces before fleeing to Taiwan.

*The two characters are homonyms, both pronounced Lu; to distinguish them, one is usually kept as Lu and the other spelled differently. Luh is from Cambridge History of China; Lou is from A.C. Moule's Rulers of China (1957). When one irregular spelling is used, the other is kept as regular (Lu). The two systems are distinct and not used simultaneously.

Qing dynasty (清朝) (1636–1912 AD)

Taiping Heavenly Kingdom (太平天國) (1851–1864 AD)

Empire of China (中華帝國) (1915–1916 AD) 

A short-lived attempt by statesman and general Yuan Shikai who attempted to establish himself as emperor in 1915, but his rule was universally accepted as inauthentic. After 83 days, his reign ended.

See also 
 Dynasties in Chinese history
 Timeline of Chinese history
 Monarchy of China
 List of Chinese leaders
 List of presidents of China
 List of leaders of the Republic of China
 List of presidents of the Republic of China
 List of leaders of the People's Republic of China
 List of national leaders of the People's Republic of China
 List of presidents of the People's Republic of China
 List of rulers of Taiwan
 List of Khagans of the Göktürks
 List of rulers of Tibet
 List of emperors of Tibet
 List of Khitan rulers
 List of Jurchen chieftains
 List of Mongol rulers
 Chairman of the Kuomintang
 Leader of the Chinese Communist Party
 List of leaders of the Democratic Progressive Party

References

External links

 List of Chinese rulers

 
Monarchs

Monarchs
Lists of Chinese people